"In the Air" is a song by Australian rock band DMA's. It was released in February 2018 as the second single from their second studio album For Now. The song was certified gold in Australia in 2020.

An acoustic version was released on 3 July 2018.

Reception
Al Newstead from Triple J called it a "sweeping ballad".

Certifications

References

2018 singles
2017 songs
DMA's songs